The men's 105 kg competition of the weightlifting events at the 2011 Pan American Games in Guadalajara, Mexico, was held on October 27 at the Weightlifting Forum.  The defending champion was Joël MacKenzie from Cuba.

Each lifter performed in both the snatch and clean and jerk lifts, with the final score being the sum of the lifter's best result in each. The athlete received three attempts in each of the two lifts; the score for the lift was the heaviest weight successfully lifted. This weightlifting event was the second heaviest men's event at the weightlifting competition, limiting competitors to a maximum of 105 kilograms of body mass.

Schedule
All times are Central Standard Time (UTC-6).

Results
8 athletes from 8 countries took part.

References

External links
Weightlifting schedule

Weightlifting at the 2011 Pan American Games